Carl Albert Luckenbach was the first postmaster of Luckenbach, Texas. He would later move to another village which would become known as Albert, Texas.

References

People from Gillespie County, Texas
Texas postmasters
1851 births
1939 deaths